Rhaphidura is a genus of swift in the family Apodidae. 
It contains the following species:
 Silver-rumped spinetail (Rhaphidura leucopygialis)
 Sabine's spinetail (Rhaphidura sabini)

 
Bird genera
Taxa named by Eugene W. Oates
Taxonomy articles created by Polbot